In the mathematical field of numerical analysis, a Bernstein polynomial is a polynomial that is a linear combination of Bernstein basis polynomials. The idea is named after Sergei Natanovich Bernstein.

A numerically stable way to evaluate polynomials in Bernstein form is de Casteljau's algorithm.

Polynomials in Bernstein form were first used by Bernstein in a constructive proof for the Weierstrass approximation theorem. With the advent of computer graphics, Bernstein polynomials, restricted to the interval [0, 1], became important in the form of Bézier curves.

Definition
The n+1 Bernstein basis polynomials of degree n are defined as

 

where  is a binomial coefficient.

So, for example, 

The first few Bernstein basis polynomials for blending 1, 2, 3 or 4 values together are:
 

The Bernstein basis polynomials of degree n form a basis for the vector space  of polynomials of degree at most n with real coefficients.  A linear combination of Bernstein basis polynomials

is called a Bernstein polynomial or polynomial in Bernstein form of degree n.  The coefficients  are called Bernstein coefficients or Bézier coefficients.

The first few Bernstein basis polynomials from above in monomial form are:

Properties
The Bernstein basis polynomials have the following properties:
 , if  or 
  for 
 
  and  where  is the Kronecker delta function: 
  has a root with multiplicity  at point  (note: if , there is no root at 0).
  has a root with multiplicity  at point  (note: if , there is no root at 1).
 The derivative can be written as a combination of two polynomials of lower degree: 
 The k-th derivative at 0: 
The k-th derivative at 1: 
 The indefinite integral is given by  
 The definite integral is constant for a given n: 
This maximum takes the value 
 The Bernstein basis polynomials of degree  form a partition of unity: 
 A Bernstein polynomial can always be written as a linear combination of polynomials of higher degree: 
 The expansion of the Chebyshev Polynomials of the First Kind into the Bernstein basis is

Approximating continuous functions
Let ƒ be a continuous function on the interval [0, 1]. Consider the Bernstein polynomial

It can be shown that

uniformly on the interval [0, 1].

Bernstein polynomials thus provide one way to prove the Weierstrass approximation theorem that every real-valued continuous function on a real interval [a, b] can be uniformly approximated by polynomial functions over .

A more general statement for a function with continuous kth derivative is

where additionally

is an eigenvalue of Bn; the corresponding eigenfunction is a polynomial of degree k.

Probabilistic proof

This proof follows Bernstein's original proof of 1912. See also Feller (1966) or Koralov & Sinai (2007).

Suppose K is a random variable distributed as the number of successes in n independent Bernoulli trials with probability x of success on each trial; in other words, K has a binomial distribution with parameters n and x. Then we have the expected value  and

By the weak law of large numbers of probability theory,

for every δ > 0. Moreover, this relation holds uniformly in x, which can be seen from its proof via Chebyshev's inequality, taking into account that the variance of  K, equal to  x(1−x), is bounded from above by  irrespective of x.

Because ƒ, being continuous on a closed bounded interval, must be uniformly continuous on that interval, one infers a statement of the form

uniformly in x. Taking into account that ƒ is bounded (on the given interval) one gets for the expectation
 
uniformly in x. To this end one splits the sum for the expectation in two parts. On one part the difference does not exceed ε; this part cannot contribute more than ε.
On the other part the difference exceeds ε, but does not exceed 2M, where M is an upper bound for |ƒ(x)|; this part cannot contribute more than 2M times the small probability that the difference exceeds ε.

Finally, one observes that the absolute value of the difference between expectations never exceeds the expectation of the absolute value of the difference, and

Elementary proof 

The probabilistic proof can also be rephrased in an elementary way, using the underlying probabilistic ideas but proceeding by direct verification:

The following identities can be verified:

  ("probability")
  ("mean")
  ("variance")

In fact, by the binomial theorem

The identities (1), (2), and (3) follow easily using the substitution .

Within these three identities, use the above basis polynomial notation

and let

Thus, by identity (1)

so that

Since f is uniformly continuous, given , there is a  such that  whenever
.  Moreover, by continuity, . But then

The first sum is less than ε. On the other hand, by identity (3) above, and since , the second sum is bounded by  times

(Chebyshev's inequality)

It follows that the polynomials fn tend to f uniformly.

Generalizations to higher dimension 
Bernstein polynomials can be generalized to  dimensions – the resulting polynomials have the form . In the simplest case only products of the unit interval  are considered; but, using affine transformations of the line, Bernstein polynomials can also be defined for products . For a continuous function  on the -fold product of the unit interval, the proof that  can be uniformly approximated by

  
is a straightforward extension of Bernstein's proof in one dimension.

See also
Polynomial interpolation
Newton form
Lagrange form
Binomial QMF (also known as Daubechies wavelet)

Notes

References
, English translation

, Russian edition first published in 1940

External links
 

 
 
 
  from University of California, Davis. Note the error in the summation limits in the first formula on page 9.
 
  Feature Column from American Mathematical Society
 
 
 
 
 
 

Numerical analysis
Polynomials
Articles containing proofs